Albersdorf is a municipality in the Saale-Holzland district of Thuringia, Germany. As of 2018, the population is 288.

Geography

References

Municipalities in Thuringia
Saale-Holzland-Kreis